A darshan or baal darshan is a Jewish Scriptural interpreter. Since the Middle Ages, it has referred to a professional sermonizer more broadly. The title was given to Abtalion and Shemaiah in the 1st century BCE.

Since the 1990s, some branches of Liberal Judaism have ordained lay leaders and chaplains as darshanim.

See also
 Maggid
 Moshe ha-Darshan

References

Hebrew words and phrases
Jewish leadership roles
Judaism terminology
Non-denominational Judaism